The Armaguerra Mod. 39 is an Italian semi-automatic rifle designed by Gino Revelli, the son of Abiel Bethel Revelli, who is known for the Fiat-Revelli machine gun and Glisenti Model 1910 pistol.  Two versions of the rifle exist;  one in 6.5x52 and the other 7.35×51mm.

Genesis and development 
The weapon was designed by Francesco Nasturzio and Gino Revelli, the son of the brilliant Abiel Bethel Revelli. It was positively tested by the Royal Italian Army in 1939, who preferred it, in the contest for the supply of a semi-automatic rifle, to the Scotti Mod. X and the Breda Mod. 1935 PG and ordered 10,000 unit to the Società Anonima Revelli Armiguerra of Genoa.

The gun took its name from the Telegraphic Code of Company, Armaguerra. In 1938 the Italian army had established the transition from 6.5 mm × 52 mm to the more lethal 7.35 x 51 mm Carcano. In this caliber were constructed the Carcano Mod. 38 and the Armaguerra Mod.39.

With the entry of Italy into World War II, being far from complete the conversion to the new caliber, the production probably interrupted to 2,000 pieces, two type of munitions would have created confusion in the supply. The conversion of Mod. 39 to the old caliber 6.5 × 52 mm required a partial redesign, because of the greater pressure produced by this ammunition (3,000 atm compared to 2,500 atm of 7.35 x 51 mm Carcano cartridge). It went into production close to 1943, when the capitulation of Italy limited the production to a few hundred units.

References

External links
 Armaguerra Model 1939 Semiauto Rifle video

World War II infantry weapons of Italy
Rifles of Italy
World War II semi-automatic rifles